Aldrich Bay Park is a park with fishing village as its theme.  Located at the waterfront of Aldrich Bay, Sai Wan Ho, Hong Kong, it is 22,000 square feet in size. The park was opened on 11 April 2011 and is now managed by the Leisure and Cultural Services Department.

Location

The park act as a wind corridor, allowing the sea breeze to blow to inland areas, reducing the wall effect of the high-rise buildings beside the sea, including Les Saisons.

History
After the 10-year planning of Aldrich Bay Park, more than 130-million dollars were used in the construction. The park was formerly the Aldrich Bay Bus terminus, which had stopped using since June 2006. The termini of some bus routes were moved to the nearby Sai Wan Ho (Grand Promenade) Bus Terminus. After that, the land was temporarily used as a golf course for practice. 10,000 people used this facility each month. As the golf course's fence blocked the view of some flats in Les Saisons and the course's lighting causes a serious light pollution problem, some residents nearby protested against it.

Design
The park adopts the theme of old fishing village, and uses steel, glass, wood and bamboo as building materials. A 1:1 fishing vessel and 2 Sampans are placed in the pool, while 2 wood corridors act as a jetty for boarding the fishing vessel. A fishing shed model is also placed beside the jetty.

The fishing vessel was once placed in a park in Tuen Mun, it is moved to this park due to vandalism. Other facilities like Scent Garden, Tai chi garden and children's playground are also available in this park.

Related news
Aldrich Bay Park was complained by the nearby residents just after its opening as some trespassers entered the park at night after its opening hours, producing loud noise.

Besides, fun fairs and singing performances are frequently held in the park. As the loudspeakers generate loud noise, some nearby residents find it annoying.

Opening hours
The park opens from 06:00 to 23:00 every day.

Non-smoking regulation
Smoking is not allowed in the park.

Transportation

MTR
Sai Wan Ho station (Island line)

Ferry
Sai Wan Ho Ferry Pier 
Sai Wan Ho to Kwun Tong Line 
Sai Wan Ho to Sam Ka Tsuen Line

Bus and minibus
Sai Wan Ho (Grand Promenade) Bus Terminus
Bus Route 2 (to Central)
Bus Route 14 (to Stanley)
Bus Route 720 (to Central)
Minibus Route 20 (to Chai Wan Industrial City)

Lei King Road Bus Stop
Bus Route 2A, 2X, 77, 82S, 99, 722, N8
Minibus Route 65
Residents' Service Route NR17, NR811

Tai On Street Bus Stop
Bus Route 77, 82S, 85A, 99, 110, 307P, 606, 606A
Minibus Route 20, 65, 68
Residents' Service Route NR811

Nearby places
Soho East
Hong Kong Film Archive
Sai Wan Ho Civic Centre
Fireboat Alexander Grantham Exhibition Gallery

References

Sai Wan Ho
Urban public parks and gardens in Hong Kong
2011 establishments in Hong Kong